Titan Entertainment Group (TEG) is a British retailing, publishing and merchandise company — owner of the Forbidden Planet London bookstores, and Titan Publishing Group (which comprises Titan Books, Titan Comics, and Titan Merchandise). TEG is owned by Nick Landau and Dr. Vivian Cheung.

History

Titan Distributors / Forbidden Planet 
Up through the mid-1970s, only a small range of American comic books were available in British newsagents. In 1973, Landau saw the distribution opportunity and formed Comic Media Distributors. 

In 1978, along with Mike Lake and Mike Luckman, Landau reorganized Comic Media Distributors to become Titan Distributors.

They opened the first Forbidden Planet bookstore, on Denmark Street in London.

Titan Books 
Titan Books followed the first title with numerous other 2000 A.D. reprints. Subsequently, Titan Books expanded operations, putting out its first original title in 1987 and taking over publishing Escape magazine (although the title was canceled in 1989).

Transformation into Titan Entertainment Group 
In 1992, Landau, Luckman, and Lake dissolved their partnership and traded their company shares: Landau became sole owner of Titan Books and Forbidden Planet London; Luckman became sole owner of Forbidden Planet's New York stores, and Lake became sole owner of Titan Distributors (which he almost immediately sold to the U.S.-based Diamond Comic Distributors).

Titan Magazines

Titan Merchandise 
Titan Merchandise (launched in 2011) produces licensed merchandise for global properties, including Marvel Comics, Star Wars, Doctor Who, The Beatles, Star Trek, Alien, Breaking Bad, Ghostbusters, and Hammer Horror.

References

External links 
 

 
Entertainment companies of the United Kingdom
Entertainment companies established in 1993
British companies established in 1993